Gustav Mahler in Toblach (subtitled I Went Out This Morning Over the Countryside) is a live album by pianist Uri Caine's Ensemble featuring compositions by Gustav Mahler recorded in Italy and released as a double CD on the Winter & Winter label in 1999.

Reception
Writing for All About Jazz, David Adler said "Classical purists haven't been too thrilled with Caine's efforts, but they aren't really his audience. Whether you'd rather listen to Uri Caine's Mahler or to Mahler himself is a subjective question. But one shouldn't deny Caine credit for teaching us something new about music's elasticity".

Track listing
All compositions by Gustav Mahler

Disc One:
 "Symphonie No. 5, Funeral March" – 7:06  
 "I Often Think They Have Merely Gone Out!" (from Songs on the Death of Children) 10:24  
 "Now Will the Sun Rise as Brightly" (from Songs on the Death of Children) – 5:35  
 "The Drummer Boy" (from The Boy's Magic Horn) – 14:03  
 "Introduction to Symphony No. 5, Adagietto" – 1:53  
 "Symphony No. 5, Adagietto" – 12:42

Disc Two: 
 "Symphony No. 1 "Titan", 3rd Movement" – 13:22  
 "I Went Out This Morning Over the Countryside, Symphony No. 2 "Resurrection", Andante Moderato" 13:26  
 "Symphony No. 2 "Resurrection", Primal Light" – 2:34  
 "Interlude to the Farewell" (from The Song of the Earth) – 1:49  
 "The Farewell" (from The Song of the Earth) – 26:25

Personnel
Uri Caine – piano, keyboards
Ralph Alessi – trumpet
David Binney – alto saxophone
Mark Feldman – violin 
Aaron Bensoussan – oud, vocals
DJ Olive – turntables, electronics
Michael Formanek – bass
Jim Black – drums

References

Winter & Winter Records live albums
Uri Caine live albums
1999 live albums